Madhavaiah Anantanarayanan (1 May 1907 – 18 November 1981) was an Indian lawyer and civil servant who served as the Chief Justice of Madras State (later Tamil Nadu) from 1966 to 1969.

Early life 

Anantanarayanan was born in Madras on 1 May 1907 to a Vadama Iyer Brahmin family, and had his schooling at Sir M. Ct. Muthiah High School and the Hindu High School. He did his graduation at the Presidency College, Madras and post-graduation at Gonville and Caius College, Cambridge.

Career 

Anantanarayanan joined the Indian civil service on 15 October 1929 and served as Sub-Collector and Joint Magistrate in various districts of the Madras Presidency. He became a District Judge on 8 March 1940 and was appointed to the Madras High Court on 10 August 1959. Anantanarayanan served as Chief Justice of Tamil Nadu from 1966 till his retirement on 1 May 1969. Anantanarayanan also served as Director of Legal Studies, Madras from 1955 to 1959.

Death 

Anantanarayanan died on 18 November 1981 at his son's residency in Bombay.

References 
 Tributes

20th-century Indian lawyers
1907 births
1981 deaths
Politicians from Chennai
20th-century Indian judges
Chief Justices of the Madras High Court